Drader may refer to:

Performing and modelling

Brian Drader, playwright

Sports figures

Daryl Drader, hockey player
Drader Manufacturing Industries, a manufacturing company in Canada